The Canada Life Building is a historic office building in Toronto, Ontario, Canada.

It is located at University and Queen Street in the city's downtown core. Work on the new headquarters of the Canada Life Assurance Company began in 1929 and it opened in 1931. It was the fourth building to serve as the headquarters of Canada Life, Canada's oldest, and at the time largest insurance company. Previously it had been housed in offices at Bay and King Street.

The Beaux Arts structure was the first of a series of planned structures along University Avenue, but the Great Depression halted these plans. When it was completed it was one of the tallest buildings in Toronto. It remains one of the largest office buildings in Toronto with windows that can be opened by its occupants.

The Canada Life Campus has been expanded several times over the last few decades and now consists of five structures: 330 University Avenue, 190 Simcoe Street, 180 Simcoe Street, 180 Queen Street West and a 5-storey parking garage at 206 Simcoe Street. In addition, the Campbell House Museum was moved to the South-East corner of the Campus in 1972.

Weather beacon 

The building is perhaps best known for its weather beacon, whose colour codes provide summarized weather forecasts at a glance. The information is updated four times every day by Environment Canada's Weather Centre at Toronto Pearson International Airport. The forecast is for the next 4 hours. The top light shows:
 Steady green = clear
 Steady orange = cloudy
 Flashing orange = rain
 Flashing white = snow
The white lights along the support tower show:
 Lights running up = warmer
 Lights running down = cooler
 Steady = steady temperature / No change

Forecast Period:

 7am beacon signals the conditions for the morning.
 11am beacon signals the conditions for the afternoon.
 3pm beacon signals the conditions for the evening.
 7pm night beacon signals the conditions for the following day.

The beacon was the first of its kind to appear in Canada and was built at a cost of $25,000.

190 Simcoe Street 
190 Simcoe Street is a 9-floor addition to the Campus, built directly West of the original. It connects to the original building through two enclosed, elevated walkways It was completed in 1970.

180 Simcoe Street 
180 Simcoe Street is a 12-floor addition to the Campus, built directly South of 190 Simcoe Street. It connects to 190 Simcoe Street through a short walkway. It was completed in 1994.

Canada Life Tower - 180 Queen Street West
Canada Life Tower is a 16-floor addition to the campus, built South-West of the original. It connects to the rest of the Campus through an underground loading dock area. It totals 16 floors and was designed by Kuwabara Payne McKenna. It was completed in 2005.

See also 

 Canada Life Building, Montreal
 Weather Machine, a sculpture in Portland, Oregon

References

External links 
 Virtual tour
 
 

Buildings and structures in Toronto
Beaux-Arts architecture in Canada
City of Toronto Heritage Properties
Office buildings completed in 1931